Pairwise testing may refer to:
All-pairs testing
Pairwise comparison

See also
Paired difference test